The McMasters is a 1970 American Western film directed by Alf Kjellin and starring Burl Ives, Brock Peters, David Carradine and Nancy Kwan.

Producer Monroe Sachson had made The Incident with Brock Peters and the two were looking around for another film to make together. The budget was around $2 million. The film was shot in New Mexico.

The film was cut by the US distributors, Chevron Pictures, and Peters, the writer and producer asked to have their names removed from the film. Ultimately, two versions of the film were released. For its NYC debut, it played in two different theatres, one showing the cut version, the other showing the director's cut.

Plot
An ex-slave is given half-ownership of a farm following the Civil War. He can't find anyone to work for him until Native Americans help. Bigots try to shut him down.

Cast
 Burl Ives as McMasters 
 Brock Peters as Benjie 
 David Carradine as White Feather 
 Nancy Kwan as Robin 
 Jack Palance as Kolby 
 Dane Clark as Spencer 
 John Carradine as Preacher 
 L. Q. Jones as Russell 
 R. G. Armstrong as Watson 
 Alan Vint as Hank

Novelization
Concurrent with the release of the film, Award Books published a novelization of the screenplay by Dudley Dean McGaughey under his primary by-line, Dean Owen.

References

External links

1970 films
1970 Western (genre) films
American Western (genre) films
1970s English-language films
Films directed by Alf Kjellin
1970s American films